The Roman Catholic Diocese of Saint John's–Basseterre is a diocese of the Latin Church of the Roman Catholic Church, covering five English-speaking jurisdictions in the Caribbean. The bishopric is a suffragan of the Metropolitan Archdiocese of Castries, and a member of the Antilles Episcopal Conference, but remains dependent on the missionary Roman Congregation for the Evangelization of Peoples.

Cathedrals 
It has two cathedrals, the Holy Family Cathedral in St John's, Antigua, and a co-cathedral, the Cathedral of the Immaculate Conception in Basseterre, St Kitts. Both churches are the seats of the bishop, who is currently the Most Rev. Robert Llanos, formerly Auxiliary Bishop of Port of Spain (Trinidad and Tobago).

The Holy Family Cathedral was completed and opened in 1987, during the tenure of Bishop Donald James Reece (1981-2007), who dedicated it. It was designed in the Modernist style with an octagon with a bell tower at the centre. On the tower there is a large cross, the largest external church cross in the country. There are also electronic synthesised bells which chime on the hour, before Mass and at the end of funerals.

The cathedral is of post Vatican II Latin Rite, but on the feasts of the Epiphany and of the Assumption, Sunday Mass is celebrated according to the Byzantine Rite.

Extent and statistics 
The diocese encompasses the islands of five Anglophone countries in the Lesser Antilles : 
 Antigua and Barbuda, which has the see Holy Family Cathedral in St John's, Antigua
 Saint Kitts and Nevis, which has a co-cathedral of the Immaculate Conception in Basseterre, St Kitts
 Anguilla 
 Montserrat
 the British Virgin Islands.

As per 2014, it pastorally served 16,743 Catholics (9.0% of 186,880 total) on 1,059 km² in 13 parishes and 20 missions with 12 priests (3 diocesan, 9 religious), 3 deacons and 21 lay religious (9 brothers, 12 sisters).

History 
The diocese was erected on 16 January 1971 as Diocese of Saint John's, on territory split off from the Roman Catholic Diocese of Roseau (Dominica).

On 21 June 1981 it was renamed as Diocese of Saint John's–Basseterre.

Episcopal ordinaries 
(all Roman Rite)
Suffragan Bishop of Saint John's 
 Joseph Oliver Bowers, S.V.D. (16 January 1971 — 21 June 1981)

Suffragan Bishops of Saint John's–Basseterre
 Joseph Oliver Bowers, S.V.D. (21 June 1971 — 17 July 1981, retired)
 Donald James Reece (17 July 1981 — 12 October 2007, appointed as Coadjutor Archbishop of Kingston in Jamaica)
 sede vacante, Apostolic Administrator, Gabriel Malzaire (12 October 2007 — 19 November 2011)
 Kenneth David Oswin Richards (19 November 2011 — 29 April 2016, appointed as Coadjutor Archbishop of Kingston in Jamaica)
 sede vacante, Apostolic Administrator, Robert Anthony Llanos (20 June 2016 — 18 December 2018)
 Robert Anthony Llanos (since 18 December 2018)

See also 
 List of Catholic dioceses (structured view)
 St. Theresa Church, Charlestown
 St. William's Church, Road Town

References

Sources and external links 
 GCatholic, with Google map and satellite photo
  Radio for the Diocese
 

Roman Catholic dioceses in the Caribbean
Catholic Church in Saint Kitts and Nevis
Catholic Church in Anguilla
Catholic Church in Antigua and Barbuda
Catholic Church in the British Virgin Islands
Catholic Church in Montserrat
Organisations based in Saint Kitts and Nevis
St. John's-Bassetere
St. John's-Bassetere
 
Roman Catholic cathedrals in Antigua and Barbuda
Roman Catholic Ecclesiastical Province of Castries